Cape Leeuwin is the most south-westerly point of the Australian mainland.

Cape Leeuwin may also refer to the following subjects:

Cape Leeuwin Lighthouse, a lighthouse on Cape Leeuwin
, a lighthouse tender built in 1924, and in naval service during World War II
Paraserianthes lophantha or Cape Leeuwin Wattle, a species of wattle tree native to the coastal regions of south-west Australia
The St Alouarn Islands off Cape Leeuwin are sometimes referred to as the Cape Leeuwin Islands

See also
Leeuwin